The Penn-Jersey Athletic Association is a sports conference of private schools in the Delaware Valley including schools in both New Jersey and Pennsylvania.

The conference was re-created in 1990 with 13 member schools after a previous incarnation of the league had died out in 1986.

Sports
Sports competition is offered across the school year by season include:
 Fall - Cross County (boys and girls), Soccer (boys and girls), Girls Tennis, and Girls Volleyball
 Winter - Basketball (boys and girls)
 Spring - Softball, Baseball, Track and Field (boys and girls) and Boys Tennis

Member schools
, member schools are:
Jack M. Barrack Hebrew Academy, Bryn Mawr, PA
Doane Academy, Burlington, NJ
Girard College, Philadelphia, PA
International Christian High School, Philadelphia, PA
Life Center Academy, Burlington, NJ
Mercy Vocational High School, Philadelphia, PA
Morrisville High School, Morrisville, PA
New Jersey United Christian Academy, Cream Ridge, NJ
Pine Forge Academy, Pine Forge, PA
Solebury School, New Hope, PA
Villa Victoria Academy, West Trenton, NJ
The City School, Philadelphia, PA
Community Academy, Philadelphia, PA
Foundation Collegiate Academy, Trenton, NJ
The King's Christian School, Cherry Hill, NJ
Kohelet Yeshiva High School, Merion Station, PA
New Foundations Charter, Philadelphia, PA
Cristo Rey, Philadelphia, PA

References

External links
Home page, Penn-Jersey Athletic Association

1990 establishments in New Jersey
1990 establishments in Pennsylvania
New Jersey high school athletic conferences